Welsford Parker Artz House, also known as Catawba Hill and Artz House, is a historic home located near Old Fort, McDowell County, North Carolina.  It was built between 1904 and 1906, and is -story, five-bay, frame dwelling with Queen Anne and Colonial Revival style design elements.  A small, one-story, gabled ell was added between 1912 and 1928.  The house is sheathed in weatherboard and a moderately pitched, asphalt shingled roof with a dominant front gable and one-story wraparound front porch.

It was listed on the National Register of Historic Places in 1990.

References

Houses on the National Register of Historic Places in North Carolina
Queen Anne architecture in North Carolina
Colonial Revival architecture in North Carolina
Houses completed in 1904
Houses in McDowell County, North Carolina
National Register of Historic Places in McDowell County, North Carolina